The women's pole vault event at the 2023 European Athletics Indoor Championships was held on 3 March at 09:15 (qualification) and on 4 March at 19:05 local time.

Medalists

Records

Results

Qualification
Qualification: Qualifying performance 4.65 (Q) or at least 8 best performers (q) advance to the Final.

Final

References

2023 European Athletics Indoor Championships
Pole vault at the European Athletics Indoor Championships